Eric Jon Brown (born March 20, 1975) is a former American football safety in the National Football League. He was drafted by the Denver Broncos in the second round of the 1998 NFL Draft. He played college football at Mississippi State.

Brown also played for the Houston Texans. He won a Super Bowl championship with the Broncos in Super Bowl XXXIII over the Atlanta Falcons.

References

1975 births
Living people
Judson High School alumni
American football safeties
Blinn Buccaneers football players
Mississippi State Bulldogs football players
Denver Broncos players
Houston Texans players
Players of American football from San Antonio